The Zimbabwe national cricket team toured the West Indies from March to April 2000 and played a two-match Test series against the West Indies cricket team which the West Indies won 2–0. Zimbabwe were captained by Andy Flower; the West Indies by Jimmy Adams.

Test series summary

First Test

Second Test

References

External links

2000 in Zimbabwean cricket
2000 in West Indian cricket
1999-2000
International cricket competitions from 1997–98 to 2000
West Indian cricket seasons from 1970–71 to 1999–2000